The 1932 Arizona gubernatorial election took place on November 8, 1932. Incumbent Governor George W. P. Hunt ran for the Democratic nomination, but lost in the primary to Benjamin Baker Moeur, whose pre-gubernatorial experience included service as the Secretary of the Board of Education for Arizona State Teacher's College, which would later become Arizona State University.

Benjamin Baker Moeur defeated cattle rancher Jack Kinney in the general election, and was sworn in as Arizona's fourth Governor (excluding non-consecutive terms) on January 3, 1933.

Democratic primary
The Democratic primary took place on September 13, 1932. Incumbent Governor George W. P. Hunt, who was elected to his seventh (non-consecutive) term over then-incumbent Governor John Calhoun Phillips in 1930, was opposed in the primary by Benjamin Baker Moeur, who had served as Secretary of the Board of Education for Arizona State Teacher's College prior to running for the office of Governor, as well as Attorney General K. Berry Peterson, State Senator Fred Sutter, and Webster C. Reed.

Candidates
 George W. P. Hunt, incumbent Governor, former Ambassador to Siam
 Benjamin Baker Moeur, Secretary of the Board of Education
 K. Berry Peterson, Attorney General of Arizona
 Fred Sutter, State Senator
 Webster C. Reed

Results

Republican primary

Candidates
 J. C. "Jack" Kinney, cattle rancher
 W. W. Midgley, rancher
 William Walton

Results

General election

References

Bibliography

1932
1932 United States gubernatorial elections
Gubernatorial
November 1932 events in the United States